The 2012 William Hill Greyhound Derby took place during April and May with the final being held on 26 May 2012 at Wimbledon Stadium.

Blonde Snapper trained by Mark Wallis won the final missing the trouble encountered by most of the field, he won after holding off a challenge from Farloe Ironman to take the £125,000 first prize. Defending champion Taylors Sky was well placed when being baulked.

Irish entry Razldazl Jayfkay trained by Dolores Ruth had broken the track record in the second round with a 28.08sec performance but suffered in a messy semi final race and was eliminated along with her other two leading runners Razldazl Rioga and Razldazl Bugatti.

Final result 
At Wimbledon (over 480 metres):

Distances 
1¾, 3½, short head, ½, 1 (lengths)
The distances between the greyhounds are in finishing order and shown in lengths. One length is equal to 0.08 of one second.

Quarter finals

Semi finals

See also
2012 UK & Ireland Greyhound Racing Year

References

External links
Greyhound Board of Great Britain
Greyhound Data

Greyhound Derby
English Greyhound Derby
Grey
English Greyhound Derby
English Greyhound Derby